Caudotestis is a genus of trematodes in the family Opecoelidae.

Species
Caudotestis azurionis (Yamaguti, 1951)
Caudotestis dorosomatis (Yamaguti, 1951)
Caudotestis fusiformis (Price, 1934)
Caudotestis glacialis (Zdzitowiecki, 1989) Cribb, 2005
Caudotestis kerguelensis (Prudhoe & Bray, 1973) Cribb, 2005
 Caudotestis nicolli Issaitschikov, 1928
 Caudotestis opisthorchis (Polyanski, 1955) Cribb, 2005
 Caudotestis pachysomus Manter, 1954
 Caudotestis patagonensis Cantatore, Lancia, Lanfranchi & Timi, 2012
 Caudotestis rhabdosargi (Wang, 1982)
 Caudotestis seychellensis (Toman, 1992)
 Caudotestis spari Yamaguti, 1951
 Caudotestis trachuri (Pogorel'tseva, 1954)
 Caudotestis tyrrhenicus Paggi & Orrechia, 1976
 Caudotestis ventichthysi Bray, Waeschenbach, Dyal, Littlewood & Morand, 2014
 Caudotestis zhukovi (Yamguti, 1971)

References

Opecoelidae
Trematode genera